James West (born December 18, 1953), also known as Jim "Kimo" West, is a Canadian guitarist best known for working with "Weird Al" Yankovic. He auditioned for Yankovic after being introduced by Steve Jay and the two have worked together ever since. West can be heard and seen on all of Yankovic's videos, albums, and concerts since 1983.

West is also a composer for film and television and produced a number of CDs for independent artists. He has released fourteen solo slack-key guitar albums. He performs regularly at concerts and festivals.

Biography

West was born in Toronto, Ontario on December 18, 1953, and grew up in Tampa, Florida. At age 12, he started playing guitar. By age 16, he was playing professionally in various Florida rock bands, including at least one with Steve Jay.

In the early 1980s, he came to Los Angeles, where Jay introduced him to "Weird Al" Yankovic.

Currently, West resides in the Los Angeles area, but spends several months a year in Hawaii. He retains his Canadian citizenship.

In 2018, he received his first Grammy nomination a Moku Maluhia: Peaceful Island in the category of Best New Age Album.

In 2020 his album, More Guitar Stories received another Grammy nomination for Best New Age Album and subsequently won that category.

Discography

With "Weird Al" Yankovic
 "Weird Al" Yankovic in 3-D
 Dare to Be Stupid
 Polka Party!
 Even Worse
 UHF - Original Motion Picture Soundtrack and Other Stuff
 Off the Deep End
 Alapalooza
 Bad Hair Day
 Running with Scissors
 Poodle Hat
 Straight Outta Lynwood
 Alpocalypse
 Mandatory Fun

Solo albums
 1999 – Coconut Hat
 2004 – Nurturing the Garden – commission for the National Tropical Botanical Garden on Kaua'i
 2005 – Slack Key West
 2006 – The Hawaiian Tribute To Sublime: Livin's EZ
 2007 – Hawaiian Slack Key Guitar-Kimo Style
 2007 – Hotel Honolulu – The Hawaiian Tribute to the Eagles
 2008 – Kimo's Hawaiian Slack Key Christmas
 2012 – Na Lani O Maui: Maui Skies
 2013 – Ki Ho'alu Christmastime
 2015 – Guitar Stories: Slack Key & Beyond
 2017 – Slackers In Paradise ( with Ken Emerson )
 2018 – Moku Maluhia: Peaceful Island
 2020 – More Guitar Stories
 2021 – Ka Honua Maluhia: Peaceful World

Producer
 "Eia Mai Ka La" by Kapo Ku
 Lily Wilson by Lily Wilson
 Jose Can U See? by Bill Dana
 The Enchanted Forest
 Broken by Cynthia Clawson
 The Koolanesian Heart by Norm Compton
 Stepping Out by Diana Krall

Compilations
 The Rocky Story

Awards and nominations

Grammy Awards

References

External links
 Official website
 
 http://www.westernmostmusic.com/
 Jim West entry on Dean Guitars website

1953 births
Living people
Canadian guitarists
"Weird Al" Yankovic
Scotti Brothers Records artists
Grammy Award winners